Black-legged tick may refer to either of two species of ticks found in North America:

Ixodes scapularis, also known as the "deer tick" or "bear tick," found in eastern North America
Ixodes pacificus, the western black-legged tick, found on western coast of North America